Sulfur trifluoride is the inorganic chemical compound with the formula SF3.  It is a radical.

Structure and synthesis
Sulfur trifluoride is predicted to be pyramidal.

SF3 is generated by irradiation of crystals  with gamma rays.

References

Sulfur fluorides
Free radicals